Important events of 1990 include the Reunification of Germany and the unification of Yemen, the formal beginning of the Human Genome Project (finished in 2003), the launch of the Hubble Space Telescope, the separation of Namibia from South Africa, and the Baltic states declaring independence from the Soviet Union amidst Perestroika. Yugoslavia's communist regime collapses amidst increasing internal tensions and multiparty elections held within its constituent republics result in separatist governments being elected in most of the republics marking the beginning of the breakup of Yugoslavia. Also in this year began the crisis that would lead to the Gulf War in 1991 following the Iraq invasion and the largely internationally unrecognized annexation of Kuwait. This annexation resulted in a crisis in the Persian Gulf involving the issue of the sovereignty of Kuwait and fears by Saudi Arabia over Iraqi aggression against their oil fields near Kuwait. This led to Operation Desert Shield being enacted with an international coalition of military forces being built up on the Kuwaiti-Saudi border with demands for Iraq to peacefully withdraw from Kuwait. Also in this year, Nelson Mandela was released from prison, and Margaret Thatcher resigned as Prime Minister of the United Kingdom after more than 11 years.

1990 was an important year in the Internet's early history. In the fall of 1990, Tim Berners-Lee created the first web server and the foundation for the World Wide Web. Test operations began around December 20 and it was released outside CERN the following year. 1990 also saw the official decommissioning of the ARPANET, a forerunner of the Internet system and the introduction of the first content web search engine, Archie, on September 10.

September 14, 1990, saw the first case of successful somatic gene therapy on a patient.

Due to the early 1990s recession that began that year and uncertainty due to the collapse of the socialist governments in Eastern Europe, birth rates in many countries stopped rising or fell steeply in 1990. In most western countries the Echo Boom peaked in 1990; fertility rates declined thereafter.

Events

January 
 January 1
 Poland becomes the first country in Eastern Europe to begin abolishing its state socialist economy. Poland also withdraws from the Warsaw Pact.
 Glasgow begins its year as European Capital of Culture.
 The first Internet companies catering to commercial users, PSINet and EUnet begin selling Internet access to commercial customers in the United States and Netherlands respectively.
 Television debut of Rowan Atkinson's Mr. Bean in a Thames Television special on ITV in United Kingdom.
 January 3 – United States invasion of Panama: General Manuel Noriega is deposed as leader of Panama and surrenders to the American forces.
 January 11 – Singing Revolution: In the Lithuania SSR, 300,000 demonstrate for independence.
 January 12–19 – Most of the remaining 50,000 Armenians are driven out of Baku in the Azerbaijan SSR during the Baku pogrom.
 January 13 – Douglas Wilder becomes the first elected African American governor as he takes office in Richmond, Virginia.
 January 15
 The National Assembly of Bulgaria votes to end one party rule by the Bulgarian Communist Party.
 Thousands storm the Stasi headquarters in East Berlin in an attempt to view their government records.
 Martin Luther King Day Crash – Telephone service in Atlanta, St. Louis, and Detroit, including 9-1-1 service, goes down for nine hours, due to an AT&T software bug.
 January 20
 Cold War: Black January – Soviet troops occupy Baku, Azerbaijan SSR, under the state of emergency decree issued by General Secretary of the Communist Party of the Soviet Union Mikhail Gorbachev, and kill over 130 protesters who were demonstrating for independence. The Nakhichevan Autonomous Soviet Socialist Republic declares its independence from the USSR.
 Clashes break out between Indian troops and Muslim separatists in Kashmir.
 The government of Haiti declares a state of emergency, under which it suspends civil liberties, imposes censorship, and arrests political opponents. The state of siege is lifted on January 29.
 January 22 – Robert Tappan Morris is convicted of releasing the Morris worm.
 January 25
 Avianca Flight 52 crashes into Cove Neck, Long Island, New York after a miscommunication between the flight crew and JFK Airport officials, killing 73 people on board.
 Prime Minister of Pakistan Benazir Bhutto gives birth to a girl, becoming the first modern head of government to bear a child while in office.
 Pope John Paul II begins an eight-day tour of Cape Verde, Guinea-Bissau, Mali, Burkina Faso, and Chad.
 January 25–26 – The Burns' Day storm kills 97 in northwestern Europe.
 January 27 – The city of Tiraspol in the Moldavian SSR briefly declares independence.
 January 28 – Four months after their exit from power, the Polish United Workers' Party votes to dissolve and reorganize as the Social Democracy of the Republic of Poland.
 January 29
 The trial of Joseph Hazelwood, former skipper of the Exxon Valdez, begins in Anchorage, Alaska. He is accused of negligence that resulted in America's second worst oil spill to date.
 January 31
 Globalization – The first McDonald's in Moscow, Russian SFSR opens 8 months after construction began on May 3, 1989. 8 months later the first McDonald's in Mainland China is opened in Shenzhen.
 President of the United States George H. W. Bush gives his first State of the Union address and proposes that the U.S. and the Soviet Union make deep cuts to their military forces in Europe.

February 
 February/March – 100,000 Kashmiri Pandits leave their homeland in Jammu and Kashmir's Valley after being targeted by Islamist extremists.
 February – Smoking is banned on all cross-country flights in the United States.
 February 2 – Apartheid: F. W. de Klerk announces the unbanning of the African National Congress and promises to release Nelson Mandela.
 February 7
 The Communist Party of the Soviet Union votes to end its monopoly of power, clearing the way for multiparty elections.
 In the Tajik SSR, rioting breaks out against the settlement of Armenian refugees there.
 February 9 – ADtranz low floor tram world's first completely low-floor tram introduced in Bremen.
 February 10
 President of South Africa F. W. de Klerk announces that Nelson Mandela will be released the next day.
 Las Cruces Bowling Alley massacre: 2 people walked into the 10 Pin Alley in Las Cruces, New Mexico, (known then as the Las Cruces Bowl) and shot seven people, four of whom were killed. The case is currently unsolved.
 February 11 – Nelson Mandela is released from Victor Verster Prison, near Cape Town, South Africa, after 27 years behind bars.
 February 12 – Representatives of NATO and the Warsaw Pact meet in Ottawa for an "Open Skies" conference. The conference results in agreements about superpower troop levels in Europe and on German reunification.
 February 13
 German reunification: An agreement is reached for a two-stage plan to reunite Germany.
 Drexel Burnham Lambert files for bankruptcy protection, Chapter 11.
 February 14 – The Pale Blue Dot photograph of Earth is sent back from the Voyager 1 probe after completing its primary mission, from around 5.6 billion kilometers (3.5 billion mi) away.
 February 15
 The United Kingdom and Argentina restore diplomatic relations after 8 years. The UK had severed ties in response to Argentina's invasion of the Falkland Islands, a British Dependent Territory, in 1982.
 In Cartagena, Colombia, a summit is held between President of the United States George H. W. Bush, President of Bolivia Jaime Paz Zamora, President of Colombia Virgilio Barco Vargas, and President of Peru Alan García. The leaders pledge additional cooperation in fighting international drug trafficking.
 February 25 – The Sandinistas are defeated in the Nicaraguan elections, with Violeta Chamorro elected as the new president of Nicaragua (the first elected woman president in the Americas), replacing Daniel Ortega.
 February 26 – The USSR agrees to withdraw all 73,500 troops from Czechoslovakia by July, 1991.
 February 27 – Exxon Valdez oil spill: Exxon and its shipping company are indicted on 5 criminal counts.
 February 28 – President of Nicaragua Daniel Ortega announces a cease-fire with the U.S.-backed contras.

March 
 March 1
 A fire at the Sheraton Hotel in Cairo, Egypt, kills 16 people.
 Steve Jackson Games is raided by the U.S. Secret Service, prompting the later formation of the Electronic Frontier Foundation.
 The Royal New Zealand Navy discontinues its daily rum ration.
 Luis Alberto Lacalle, a grandson of the late politician and diplomat Luis Alberto de Herrera, is sworn in as President of Uruguay. 
 March 3 – The International Trans-Antarctic Scientific Expedition, a group of six explorers from six nations, completes the first dog sled crossing of Antarctica.
 March 8 – The Nintendo World Championships were held within the Fair Park's Automobile Building, kickstarting an almost year long gaming competition across 29 American cities.
 March 9
 Police seal off Brixton in South London after another night of protests against the poll tax.
 Newfoundland Premier Clyde Wells confirms he will rescind Newfoundland's approval of the Meech Lake Accord.
 March 10 – Prosper Avril is ousted in a coup in Haiti, eighteen months after seizing power.
 March 11 – Singing Revolution: The Lithuanian SSR declares independence from the Soviet Union with the Act of the Re-Establishment of the State of Lithuania
 March 11–13 – The March 1990 Central United States tornado outbreak produces 64 tornadoes across six US states, including four violent F4/F5 tornadoes. The outbreak leaves 2 dead, 89 injured, and causes over $500 million in damages.
 March 12 – Cold War: Soviet soldiers begin leaving Hungary under terms of an agreement to withdraw all Soviet troops by June 1.
 March 13 – The Supreme Soviet of the Soviet Union approves changes to the Constitution of the Soviet Union to create a strong U.S.-style presidency. Mikhail Gorbachev is elected to a five-year term as the first-ever President of the Soviet Union on March 15.
 March 15
 Iraq hangs British journalist Farzad Bazoft for spying. Daphne Parish, a British nurse, is sentenced to 15 years' imprisonment as an accomplice.
 Mikhail Gorbachev is elected as the first executive president of the Soviet Union. 
 Singing Revolution: The Soviet Union announces that Lithuania's declaration of independence is invalid.
 Fernando Collor de Mello takes office as President of Brazil, Brazil's first democratically elected president since Jânio Quadros in 1961. The next day, he announces a currency freeze and freezes large bank accounts for 18 months.
 March 18
 Twelve paintings and a Shang dynasty vase, collectively worth $100 to $300 million, are stolen from the Isabella Stewart Gardner Museum in Boston, Massachusetts by two thieves posing as police officers. This is the largest art theft in US history, and the paintings have not been recovered.
 Cold War: East Germany holds its first free elections.
 March 20 – Ferdinand Marcos's widow, Imelda Marcos, goes on trial for bribery, embezzlement, and racketeering.
 March 21 – After 75 years of South African rule since World War I, Namibia becomes independent.
 March 24 – 1990 Australian federal election: Bob Hawke's Labor Government is re-elected with a reduced majority, narrowly defeating the Liberal/National Coalition led by Andrew Peacock.
 March 25
 In New York City, a fire due to arson at an illegal social club called "Happy Land" kills 87.
 Archbishop of Canterbury Robert Runcie announces his intention to retire at the end of the year.
 In the Hungarian parliamentary election, Hungary's first multiparty election since 1948, the Hungarian Democratic Forum wins the most seats.
 March 26 – The 62nd Academy Awards, hosted by Billy Crystal, are held at the Dorothy Chandler Pavilion in Los Angeles, California, with Driving Miss Daisy winning Best Picture.
 March 27 – The United States begins broadcasting Radio y Televisión Martí to Cuba.
 March 28 – U.S. President George H. W. Bush posthumously awards Jesse Owens the Congressional Gold Medal.
 March 30 – Singing Revolution: After its first free elections on March 18, the Estonian SSR declares the Soviet rule to have been illegal since 1940 and declares a transition period for full independence.
 March 31 – "The Second Battle of Trafalgar": A massive anti-poll tax demonstration in Trafalgar Square, London, turns into a riot; 471 people are injured, and 341 are arrested.

April
 April 1
 The Community Charge (poll tax) takes effect in England and Wales amid widespread protests
 Strangeways Prison riot: The longest prison riot in Britain's history begins at Strangeways Prison in Manchester, and continues for 3 weeks and 3 days, until April 25.
 The 1990 United States Census begins. There are 248,709,873 residents in the U.S.
 April 6 – Robert Mapplethorpe's "The Perfect Moment" show of nude and homoerotic photographs opens at the Cincinnati Contemporary Arts Center, in spite of accusations of indecency by Citizens for Community Values.
 April 7
 Iran–Contra affair: John Poindexter is found guilty of 5 charges for his part in the scandal; the convictions are later reversed on appeal.
Scandinavian Star, a Bahamas-registered ferry, catches fire en route from Norway to Denmark, leaving 158 dead.
 April 8
 In Nepal, Birendra of Nepal lifts a ban on political parties following violent protests.
 In the Greek legislative election, the conservative New Democracy wins the most seats in the Hellenic Parliament; its leader, Konstantinos Mitsotakis, becomes Prime Minister of Greece on April 11.
 In the Socialist Federal Republic of Yugoslavia, the Socialist Republic of Slovenia holds Yugoslavia's first multiparty election since 1938. After the election, a center-right coalition led by Lojze Peterle forms Yugoslavia's first non-Communist government since 1945.
 April 9 – Comet Austin, the brightest comet visible from Earth since 1975, makes its closest approach to the sun.
 April 12 – Lothar de Maizière becomes prime minister of East Germany, heading a conservative coalition that favors German reunification.
 April 13 – Cold War: The Soviet Union apologizes for the Katyn massacre.
 April 14 – Junk bond financier Michael Milken pleaded guilty to fraud-related charges. He agreed to pay US$500 million in restitution and was sentenced on November 21 to 10 years in jail.
 April 20 – 17-year-old Christopher Kerze goes missing in Eagan, Minnesota. He remains missing .
 April 21 – Japanese Yoshio Tani, M.Sc. murders gold merchant Turkka Elovirta and businessman Juhani Komulainen in Siuntio, Finland, having convinced them to buy a nonexistent 500 kilogram stash of Nazi gold.
 April 22
 Lebanon hostage crisis: Lebanese kidnappers release American educator Robert Polhill, who had been held hostage since January 1987.
 Earth Day 20 is celebrated by millions worldwide.
 April 24
 Cold War: West Germany and East Germany agree to merge currency and economies on July 1.
STS-31: The Hubble Space Telescope is launched aboard Space Shuttle Discovery.
 President of Zaire Mobutu Sese Seko lifts a 20-year ban on opposition parties.
 April 25 – Violeta Chamorro is sworn in as President of Nicaragua, the first woman elected (February 25) in her own right as a head of state in the Americas.
 April 26: A 7.0 earthquake shakes the Chinese province of Qinghai leaving 126 dead.
 April 30 – Lebanon hostage crisis: Lebanese kidnappers release American educator Frank H. Reed, who had been held hostage since September 1986.

May
 May 1 – The former Episcopal Church in the Philippines (supervised by the Episcopal Church of the United States of America) is granted full autonomy and raised to the state of an Autocephalous Anglican province and renamed the Episcopal Church of the Philippines.
 May 2 – In London, a man brandishing a knife robs a courier of bearer bonds worth £292 million (the second largest mugging to date).
 May 2–4 – First talks between the government of South Africa and the African National Congress.
 May 4 – Singing Revolution: The Latvian SSR declares independence from the Soviet Union.
 May 8
 Singing Revolution: The Estonian SSR restores the formal name of the country, the Republic of Estonia, as well as other national emblems (the coat of arms, the flag and the anthem).
 Rafael Ángel Calderón Fournier assumes office as President of Costa Rica.
 May 9 – In South Korea, police battle anti-government protesters in Seoul and two other cities.
 May 12 – Jeanne Calment surpasses Augusta Holtz to become the oldest verified person ever.
 May 13 
 In the Philippines, gunmen kill two United States Air Force airmen near Clark Air Base on the eve of talks between the Philippines and the United States over the future of American military bases in the Philippines.
 The Dinamo–Red Star riot took place at Maksimir Stadium in Zagreb, Croatia between the Bad Blue Boys (fans of Dinamo Zagreb) and the Delije (fans of Red Star Belgrade).
 May 15
 Singing Revolution: The pro-Soviet Intermovement attempts to take power in Tallinn, Estonia, but are forced down by local Estonians.
Portrait of Dr. Gachet by Vincent van Gogh is sold for a record $82.5 million. 
 May 17 – The World Health Organization removes homosexuality from its list of diseases.
 May 18 – German reunification: East Germany and West Germany sign a treaty to merge their economic and social systems, effective July 1.
 May 19 – The US and the USSR agree to end production of chemical weapons and to destroy most of their stockpiles of chemical weapons.
 May 20 – Cold War: The first post-Communist presidential and parliamentary elections are held in Romania.
 May 21 – In Kashmir, a Kashmiri Islamic leader is assassinated and Indian security forces open fire on mourners carrying his body, killing at least 47 people.
 May 22
 Cold War: The leaders of the Yemen Arab Republic and the People's Democratic Republic of Yemen announce the unification of their countries as the Republic of Yemen.
 May 27
 In the Burmese general election, Burma's first multiparty election in 30 years, the National League for Democracy led by Aung San Suu Kyi wins in a landslide, but the State Law and Order Restoration Council nullifies the election results.
 In the Colombian presidential election, César Gaviria is elected President of Colombia; he takes office on August 7.
 May 29
 Mikhail Gorbachev arrives in Ottawa for a 29-hour visit.
 Boris Yeltsin is elected as the first ever elected president of the Russian Soviet Federative Socialist Republic.
 European Bank for Reconstruction and Development (EBRD) founded.
 May 30 – George H. W. Bush and Mikhail Gorbachev begin a four-day summit meeting in Washington, D.C.

June
 June – Joanne Rowling gets the idea for Harry Potter while on a train from Manchester to London Euston railway station. She begins writing Harry Potter and the Philosopher's Stone which will be completed in 1995 and published in 1997.
 June 1
 Cold War: U.S. President George H. W. Bush and Soviet President Mikhail Gorbachev sign a treaty to end chemical weapon production and begin destroying their respective stocks.
 Members of the Provisional Irish Republican Army shoot and kill Major Michael Dillon-Lee and Private William Robert Davies of the British Army. Dillon-Lee is killed outside his home in Dortmund, Germany and Davies is killed at a railway station in Lichfield, England.
 June 2 – The Lower Ohio Valley tornado outbreak spawns 88 confirmed tornadoes in Illinois, Indiana, Kentucky, and Ohio, killing 12; 37 tornadoes occur in Indiana, eclipsing the previous record of 21 during the Super Outbreak of April 1974.
 June 4 – Violence breaks out in the Kirghiz SSR between the majority Kyrgyz people and minority Uzbeks over the distribution of homestead land.
 June 7
 Metropolitan Alexy of Leningrad is elected Russian Orthodox Patriarch of Moscow and all Rus'.
 June 8
 The 1990 FIFA World Cup begins in Italy. This was the first broadcast of digital HDTV in history; Europe would not begin HDTV broadcasting en masse until 2004.
 Prime Minister of Israel Yitzhak Shamir ends 88 days with only an acting government by forming a coalition of right-wing and religious parties led by Shamir's Likud party.
 June 8–9 – In the Czechoslovakian parliamentary election, Czechoslovakia's first free election since 1946, the Civic Forum wins the most seats but fails to secure a majority.
 June 9 – Mega Borg oil spill in the Gulf of Mexico near Galveston, Texas.
 June 10
 Alberto Fujimori is elected President of Peru; he takes office on July 28.
 First round of the Bulgarian Constitutional Assembly election sees the Bulgarian Socialist Party win a majority. The second round of voting is held June 17.
 June 11 – Sri Lankan Civil War: The Liberation Tigers of Tamil Eelam massacre over 600 unarmed police officers in the Eastern Province.
 June 12
 Cold War: The Congress of People's Deputies of the Russian Federation formally declares its sovereignty.
 In the Algerian local elections, Algeria's first multiparty election since 1962, the Islamic Salvation Front wins control of more than half of municipalities and 32 of Algeria's 48 provinces.
 June 13 – Cold War – The destruction of the Berlin Wall by East Germany officially starts, 7 months after it was opened the previous November.
 June 13–15 – June 1990 Mineriad: Clashes break out in Bucharest between supporters and opponents of the ruling National Salvation Front.
 June 14 – 1990 Panay earthquake: An earthquake measuring  struck Panay Island in the Philippines, killing 8 and injuring 41.
 June 15 – Dublin Regulation on treatment of applications for right of asylum under European Union law agreed (comes into force 1997).
 June 17–30 – Nelson Mandela tours North America, visiting 3 Canadian and 8 U.S. cities.
 June 19 – The Communist Party of the Russian Soviet Federative Socialist Republic holds its inaugural conference in Moscow.
 June 21 – The 7.4  Manjil–Rudbar earthquake affects northern Iran with a maximum Mercalli intensity of X (Extreme), killing 35,000–50,000, and injuring 60,000–105,000.
 June 22 – Cold War: Checkpoint Charlie is dismantled.
 June 23 – In Canada, the Meech Lake Accord of 1987 dies after the Manitoba and Newfoundland legislatures fail to approve it ahead of the deadline.
 June 24 – Kathleen Margaret Brown and Irene Templeton are ordained as priests in St Anne's Cathedral in Belfast, becoming the first female Anglican priests in the United Kingdom.

July
 July 1 – German reunification: East Germany and West Germany merge their economies, the West German Deutsche Mark becoming the official currency of the East also. The Inner German border (constructed 1945) also ceases to function. 
 July 2
 1990 Hajj stampede: A stampede in a pedestrian tunnel leading to Mecca kills 1,426.
 A U.S. District Court acquits Imelda Marcos on racketeering and fraud charges.
 July 5 – In Kenya, riots erupt against the Kenya African National Union's monopoly on power.
 July 6
 President of Bulgaria Petar Mladenov resigns over accusations that he ordered tanks to disperse anti-government protests in December 1989.
 Somali President Siad Barre's bodyguards massacre anti-government demonstrators during a soccer match; 65 people are killed, more than 300 seriously injured.
 July 7–8 – In tennis, Martina Navratilova of the United States wins the 1990 Wimbledon Championships – Women's singles and Stefan Edberg of Sweden wins the 1990 Wimbledon Championships – Men's singles.
 July 8 – 1990 FIFA World Cup Final (Association football): West Germany defeats Argentina 1–0 to win the 1990 FIFA World Cup.
 July 9–11 – The 16th G7 summit is held in Houston, Texas.
 July 11 – Terrorists blow up a passenger bus travelling from Kalbajar to Tartar in Azerbaijan. 14 people are killed, 35 wounded.
 July 12 – Foster v British Gas plc decided in the European Court of Justice, a leading case on the definition of the "state" under European law.
 July 13 – The Lenin Peak disaster occurs when an earthquake triggers an avalanche in the Pamir Mountains with the loss of 43 lives.
 July 16 – 1990 Luzon earthquake: An earthquake measuring  kills more than 2,400 in the Philippines.
 July 22 – First round of the Mongolian legislative election, the first multiparty ever held in Mongolia; the Mongolian People's Party wins by a wide margin after the second round of voting on July 29.
 July 25
 George Carey, Bishop of Bath and Wells, is named as the new Archbishop of Canterbury in the Church of England.
 The Serb Democratic Party (Croatia) declares the sovereignty of the Serbs in Croatia.
 Roseanne Barr infamously sings "The Star-Spangled Banner" extremely poorly, causing controversy.
 July 26 – U.S. President George H. W. Bush signs the Americans with Disabilities Act, designed to protect disabled Americans from discrimination.
 July 27
 The parliament building and a government television house in Port of Spain, Trinidad and Tobago are stormed by the Jamaat al Muslimeen in a coup d'état attempt which lasts five days. Approximately 26 to 30 people are killed and several are wounded (including the prime minister, A. N. R. Robinson, who is shot in the leg).
 Cold War: Belarus declares its sovereignty, a key step toward independence from the Soviet Union.
 July 28 – Alberto Fujimori becomes president of Peru.
 July 30 – British politician and former Member of Parliament Ian Gow is assassinated by a Provisional Irish Republican Army car bomb outside his home in England.

August
 August 1
 The National Assembly of Bulgaria elects Zhelyu Zhelev as the first non-Communist President of Bulgaria in 40 years.
 RELCOM is created in the Soviet Union by combining several computer networks. Later in August, the Soviet Union got its first connection to the Internet.
 August 2 
 Gulf War: Iraq invades Kuwait, eventually leading to the Gulf War.
 The first ban of smoking in bars in the US (and possibly the world) is passed in San Luis Obispo, California.
 August 6
 Gulf War: The United Nations Security Council orders a global trade embargo against Iraq in response to its invasion of Kuwait.
 President of Pakistan Ghulam Ishaq Khan dismisses Prime Minister of Pakistan Benazir Bhutto, accusing her of corruption and abuse of power.
 The South African government and ANC begin talks on ending Apartheid in South Africa.
 August 7
 U.S. President Bush orders U.S. combat planes and troops to Saudi Arabia to prevent a possible attack by Iraq.
 Prime Minister of India V. P. Singh announces plan to reserve 49% of civil service jobs for lower-caste Hindus. The plan triggers riots, leaving at least 70 dead by September.
 August 8
 Iraq announces its formal annexation of Kuwait.
 The government of Peru announces an austerity plan that results in huge increases in the price of food and gasoline. The plan sets off days of rioting and a national strike on August 21.
 August 10
 Egypt, Syria, and 10 other Arab states vote to send military forces to Saudi Arabia to discourage an invasion from Iraq.
 A passenger bus, traveling along the route "Tbilisi-Agdam", is blown up; 20 people died and 30 were injured. The organizers of the crime were Armenians A. Avanesian and M. Tatevosian who were brought to criminal trial.
 August 12
 In South Africa, fighting breaks out between the Xhosa people and the Zulu people; more than 500 people are killed by the end of August.
"Sue", the best preserved Tyrannosaurus rex specimen ever found, is discovered near Faith, South Dakota by Sue Hendrickson.
 August 19 – Leonard Bernstein conducts his final concert, ending with Ludwig van Beethoven's Symphony No. 7 performed by the Boston Symphony Orchestra.
 August 21 – Gambia, Ghana, Guinea, Nigeria, and Sierra Leone send peacekeepers to intervene in the First Liberian Civil War.
 August 22 – U.S. President Bush calls up U.S. military reservists for service in the Persian Gulf Crisis.
 August 23 – East Germany and West Germany announce they will unite on October 3.
 August 24
 The Armenian SSR declares its independence from the Soviet Union.
 Northern Ireland writer Brian Keenan is released from Lebanon after being held hostage for nearly 5 years.
 Indonesian commercial television network SCTV was established as the nation's third television station after RCTI, and also debuted as local television channel in Surabaya. During its earlier days, SCTV was the rival for RCTI, the first commercial television network. SCTV began broadcasting nationwide from Jakarta by January 29, 1991.
 August 26 – In Sofia, protesters set fire to the headquarters of the governing Bulgarian Socialist Party.
 August 28 – The Plainfield Tornado (F5 on the Fujita scale) strikes the towns of Plainfield, Crest Hill, and Joliet, Illinois, killing 29 people (the strongest tornado to date to strike the Chicago metropolitan area).

September
 September 1–10 – Pope John Paul II visits Tanzania, Burundi, Rwanda and Ivory Coast.
 September 2 – Cold War: Transnistria declares its independence from the Moldavian SSR; however, the declaration is not recognized by any government.
 September 4 – Geoffrey Palmer resigns as Prime Minister of New Zealand and is replaced by Mike Moore.
 September 4–6 – Premier of North Korea Yon Hyong-muk meets with President of South Korea Roh Tae-woo, the highest level contact between leaders of the two Koreas since 1945.
 September 5 – Sri Lankan Civil War: Sri Lankan Army soldiers massacre 158 civilians.
 September 6 – In Myanmar, the State Law and Order Restoration Council orders the arrest of Aung San Suu Kyi and five other political dissidents.
 September 9
 U.S. President Bush and Soviet President Gorbachev meet in Helsinki to discuss the Persian Gulf crisis.
 First Liberian Civil War: Liberian president Samuel Doe is captured by rebel leader Prince Johnson and killed in a filmed execution.
 Sri Lankan Civil War: Sri Lankan Army soldiers massacre 184 civilians in Batticaloa.
 September 10 – The first Pizza Hut opens up in the Soviet Union.
 September 11
 Gulf War: U.S. President George H. W. Bush delivers a nationally televised speech in which he threatens the use of force to remove Iraqi soldiers from Kuwait.
 First Pizza Hut opens in the People's Republic of China, nearly 3 years after the first KFC opened there in 1987.
 September 12
 Cold War: The two German states and the Four Powers sign the Treaty on the Final Settlement with Respect to Germany in Moscow, paving the way for German reunification.
 A judge in Australia orders the arrest of media tycoon Christopher Skase, former owner of the Seven Network, after he fails to give evidence in a liquidator's examination of failed shipbuilding company Lloyds Ships Holdings, an associate of Skase's Qintex Australia Ltd.
 September 17 – In what is now regarded as a landmark event in regards to women in journalism, reporter Lisa Olson was sexually harassed by multiple New England Patriots players while trying to conduct a locker room interview.
 September 18
 The International Olympic Committee awards the 1996 Summer Olympics to Atlanta.
 Provisional Irish Republican Army assassination attempt on the life of Air Chief Marshal Sir Peter Terry at his home near Stafford, England. Hit by at least 9 bullets, the former Governor of Gibraltar survives, as does his wife, Lady Betty Terry, who is also shot (most likely by accident).
 September 24 – The Supreme Soviet of the Soviet Union grants Gorbachev special powers for 18 months to secure the Soviet Union's transition to a market economy.
 September 27 – David Souter is confirmed to serve on the Supreme Court, replacing retiring Justice William Brennan.
 September 29
 Washington, D.C.'s National Cathedral is finished.
 The Tampere Hall, the largest concert and congress center in the Nordic countries, was inaugurated in Tampere, Finland.
 September 29–30 – The United Nations World Summit for Children draws more than 70 world leaders to United Nations Headquarters.

October 
 October – Tim Berners-Lee begins his work on the World Wide Web, 19 months after his seminal 1989 outline of what would become the Web concept.
 October 1 – The rebel Rwandan Patriotic Front invades Rwanda from Uganda, marking the start of the Rwandan Civil War.
 October 2 – According to The Civil Aviation of China, two commercial planes collide on the runway at the Baiyun Airport of Guangzhou, Guangdong Province, China. The total death toll is 128; 53 people were wounded, 97 were rescued.
 October 3 – Cold War: East Germany and West Germany reunify into a single Germany.
 October 4 – Moro conflict: Rebel forces seize two military posts on the island of Mindanao, Philippines before surrendering on October 6.
 October 8
 Israeli–Palestinian conflict: In Jerusalem, Israeli police kill 17 Palestinians and wound over 100 near the Dome of the Rock mosque on the Temple Mount.
 Globalization: The first McDonald's restaurant is opened in Mainland China in Shenzhen, near Hong Kong. Since 1979, Shenzhen has been a Special economic zone.
 October 13 – Lebanese Civil War: Syrian military forces invade and occupy Mount Lebanon, ousting General Michel Aoun's government. This effectively consolidates Syria's 14 year occupation of Lebanese soil.
 October 14 – Composer and conductor Leonard Bernstein dies of a heart attack at his home in New York City at the age of 72.
 October 15
 Cold War: Soviet President Mikhail Gorbachev is awarded the Nobel Peace Prize for his efforts to lessen Cold War tensions and reform his nation.
 South Africa ends segregation of libraries, trains, buses, toilets, swimming pools, and other public facilities.
 October 17 
 North Kalimantan Communist Party insurgents sign a peace agreement which formally ends 28 years of Sarawak Communist insurgency in Malaysia.
 A major financial service of Russia, VTB Bank is founded in Russia SSR, former part of Soviet Union, as predecessor name was Vneshtorg Bank. 
 October 21 – The remains of the former Estonian head of state, Konstantin Päts, found in the Tver region in Russia, are brought to Tallinn and buried at state expense in the Metsakalmistu cemetery.
 October 22 – Nizhny Novgorod restores its official name from Gorky, Volga Federal District, Russia.
 October 24 
 In the Pakistani general election, Prime Minister Bhutto's Pakistan Peoples Party loses power to a center-right coalition government led by the Islami Jamhoori Ittehad party.
 Italian Prime Minister Giulio Andreotti reveals the existence of Operation Gladio, a clandestine NATO "stay-behind" operation in Italy during the Cold War.
 October 27
 Cold War: The Supreme Soviet of the Kirghiz SSR selects Askar Akayev as the republic's first president.
 The New Zealand National Party wins the New Zealand general election, and its leader, Jim Bolger, becomes prime minister.
 October 29 – In Norway, the government headed by Prime Minister of Norway Jan P. Syse collapses.
 October 30 – The first transatlantic fiber optic cable TAT-8 fails, causing a slowdown of Internet traffic between the United States and Europe.

November
 November – The earliest known portable digital camera sold in the United States ships.
 November 7 – Mary Robinson defeats odds-on favorite Brian Lenihan to become the first female President of Ireland.
 November 2 – British Satellite Broadcasting and Sky Television plc merge to form BSkyB as a result of massive losses.
 November 3 – Gro Harlem Brundtland assumes office as Prime Minister of Norway.
 November 5 – Rabbi Meir Kahane, founder of the far-right Kach movement, is shot dead after a speech at a New York City hotel.
 November 6 – Nawaz Sharif is sworn in as the Prime Minister of Pakistan.
 November 7 
 Indian Prime Minister Singh resigns over losing a confidence vote in the Parliament of India, having lost the support of Hindus who want a Muslim mosque in Ayodhya torn down to build a Hindu temple.
 The final military parade to mark the anniversary of the Great October Socialist Revolution takes place in the USSR.
 November 9
 A new constitution comes into effect in the Kingdom of Nepal, establishing multiparty democracy and constitutional monarchy; this is the culmination of the 1990 People's Movement.
 The Parliament of Singapore enacts the Maintenance of Religious Harmony Act.
 November 10 – Chandra Shekhar becomes Prime Minister of India as head of a minority government.
 November 12
 Akihito is enthroned as the 125th emperor of Japan following the death of his father on January 7, 1989.
 Tim Berners-Lee publishes a more formal proposal for the World Wide Web.
 November 13
 The first known web page is written.
 In New Zealand, David Gray kills 13 people in what will become known as the Aramoana massacre.
 November 14 – Germany and Poland sign a treaty confirming the border at the Oder–Neisse line. 
 November 15
STS-38: Space Shuttle Atlantis is launched on a classified U.S. military mission.
 President Bush signed new Clean Air Act, focused on urban pollution and cancer-causing emissions from industrial sources.
 November 17 – Soviet President Gorbachev proposes a radical restructuring of the Soviet government, including the creation of a Federal Council to be made up of the heads of the 15 Soviet republics.
 November 19–21 – The leaders of Canada, the United States, and 32 European states meet in Paris to formally mark the end of the Cold War.
 November 20 – Andrei Chikatilo, one of the Soviet Union's most prolific serial killers, is arrested in Novocherkassk.
 November 21
 Charter of Paris for a New Europe signed.
 Agreement for decriminalization of homosexual acts between consenting adults in Queensland, Australia.
 The Super Nintendo Entertainment System was released in Japan.
 November 22 – Margaret Thatcher announces she will not contest the second ballot of the leadership election for the Conservative Party.
 November 25 – Lech Wałęsa and Stanisław Tymiński win the first round of the first Polish presidential election.
 November 27 – Women's suffrage is introduced in the last Swiss half-canton of Appenzell Innerrhoden.
 November 28
 Prime Minister of Singapore Lee Kuan Yew resigns and is replaced by Goh Chok Tong.
 The first female Prime Minister of the United Kingdom, Margaret Thatcher, resigns after 11 years and is replaced by John Major.
 November 29
 Gulf War: The United Nations Security Council passes UN Security Council Resolution 678, authorizing military intervention in Iraq if that state does not withdraw its forces from Kuwait and free all foreign hostages by Tuesday, January 15, 1991.
 Prime Minister of Bulgaria Andrey Lukanov and his government of former communists resign under pressure from strikes and street protests.

December 
 December 1
 Channel Tunnel workers from the United Kingdom and France meet 40 metres beneath the English Channel seabed, establishing the first land connection between Great Britain and the mainland of Europe for around 8,000 years.
 President of Chad Hissène Habré is deposed by the Patriotic Salvation Movement and replaced as president by its leader Idriss Déby.
 December 2 – The German federal election (the first election held since German reunification) is won by Helmut Kohl, who becomes Chancellor of Germany.
 December 3
 1990 Wayne County Airport runway collision: At Detroit Metropolitan Airport, Northwest Airlines Flight 1482 (a McDonnell Douglas DC-9) collides with Northwest Airlines Flight 299 (a Boeing 727) on the runway, killing 8 passengers and 4 crew members.
 Mary Robinson begins her term as President of Ireland, becoming the first female to hold this office. 
 December 6
 Saddam Hussein releases a group of Western hostages he captured.
 President Hussain Muhammad Ershad of Bangladesh is forced to resign following massive protests; he is replaced by Shahabuddin Ahmed, who becomes interim president.
 December 7
 In Brussels, trade talks fail because of a dispute between the U.S. and the European Union over farm export subsidies.
 The National Assembly of Bulgaria elects Dimitar Iliev Popov as Prime Minister of Bulgaria.
 December 9
 Slobodan Milošević elected President of Serbia in first round, general elections won by his Socialist Party.
 Lech Wałęsa wins the 2nd round of Poland's first presidential election.
 December 11 – Fall of communism in Albania: Ramiz Alia, leader of the People's Socialist Republic of Albania, following massive demonstrations by students and workers, announces that a free national election will be held next spring of 1991 with political parties other than the Party of Labour permitted; an opposition Democratic Party is formed the following day.
 December 11 A multi-vehicle traffic collision known as the 1990 Interstate 75 fog disaster occurs; 12 deaths and 42 were caused by this event 
 December 16 – Jean-Bertrand Aristide is elected president of Haiti, ending 3 decades of military rule.
 December 20
 Eduard Shevardnadze announces his resignation as Soviet Minister of Foreign Affairs
 Tim Berners-Lee completes the test for the first webpage at CERN.
 December 22
 The first constitution of the Republic of Croatia is adopted.
 The Marshall Islands and Federated States of Micronesia become independent, following the termination of their trusteeship.
 The Polish government-in-exile is dissolved in London after being in exile since 1939.
 December 23 – In the Slovenian independence referendum, 88.5% of the overall electorate (94.8% of votes), with the turnout of 93.3%, support independence of the country.
 December 24 – Ramsewak Shankar is ousted as President of Suriname by a military coup.
 December 25 – Russian aircraft carrier Admiral Kuznetsov is commissioned.
 December 31 – Russian Garry Kasparov holds his title by winning the World Chess Championship match against his countryman Anatoly Karpov.

World population

Births

January

 January 2 – Karel Abraham, Czech motorcycle racer
 January 4 – Toni Kroos, German footballer
 January 5
 Leroy Fer, Dutch footballer
 Yoseob, Korean pop singer
 January 6
 Ilaria Bianchi, Italian swimmer
 Sandro Cortese, German motorcycle racer
 Abhinav Mukund, Indian cricketer
 Alex Teixeira, Brazilian footballer
 January 7 – Gregor Schlierenzauer, Austrian ski jumper
 January 8
 Robin Olsen, Swedish footballer
 Xu Xin, Chinese table tennis player
 January 9
 Todor Skrimov, Bulgarian male volleyball player
 Son Ji-hyun, South Korean actress and singer
 January 10
 Renan Buiatti, Brazilian volleyball player
 Aishwarya Rajesh, Indian actress
 January 11 – Ryan Griffin, American footballer
 January 12 – Sergey Karjakin, Ukrainian chess player
 January 13 – Liam Hemsworth, Australian actor
 January 14
 Grant Gustin, American actor and singer
 Áron Szilágyi, Hungarian fencer
 January 15
 Chris Warren, American actor
 Luke Willson, American football player
 January 16 – Simon Porte Jacquemus, French fashion designer
 January 18
 Nacho, Spanish footballer
 Gift Ngoepe, South African-born baseball player
 Bryan Oviedo, Costa Rican footballer
 Hannes Van Dahl, Swedish drummer, member of Sabaton
 January 21
 George Finn, Georgian actor
 Kelly Rohrbach, American model and actress
 Jacob Smith, American actor
 January 22
 Alizé Cornet, French tennis player
 Logic, American rapper, singer-songwriter, and record producer
 Artem Volvich, Russian volleyball player
 January 24 
 Mao Abe, Japanese singer-songwriter
 Ermin Bičakčić, Bosnian footballer
 January 25 
 Bakhtawar Bhutto Zardari, Pakistani politician
 Tom Boon, Belgian field hockey player
 Natalie Hall, Canadian actress
 January 26
 Kherington Payne, American dancer and actress
 Christopher Massey, American actor, comedian and rapper
 Peter Sagan, Slovakian road bicycle racer
 Sergio Pérez, Mexican racing driver
 January 27 – Nicholas Bett, Kenyan track and field athlete (d. 2018)
 January 28 – Luce, French actress/singer
 January 29 – MacKenzie Porter, Canadian actress and singer
 January 30
 Eddy Alvarez, American baseball player and speed skater
 Eiza González, Mexican actress and singer
 Mitchell Starc, Australian cricketer
 Jake Thomas, American actor, voice actor and photographer

February

 February 1
 Feyisa Lilesa, Ethiopian long distance and marathon runner
 Laura Marling, British singer-songwriter
 Hersi Matmuja, Albanian singer
 February 2 – Clara Alonso, Argentine actress, singer, and television hostess
 February 3 
 Birendra Lakra, Indian field hockey player
 Sean Kingston, American singer
 February 4
 Zach King, American videos maker 
 Nairo Quintana, Colombian road bicycle racer
 Katerina Stefanidi, Greek pole vaulter
 Haruka Tomatsu, Japanese voice actress
 February 5 
 Charlbi Dean Kriek, South African actress and model (d. 2022)
 Karolina Naja, Polish canoeist
 February 6 – Jermaine Kearse, American football player
 February 7
 Anna Abreu, Finnish pop singer
 jacksepticeye, Irish YouTuber
 Dalilah Muhammad, American hurdler
 Steven Stamkos, Canadian ice hockey player
 February 8
 Yacine Brahimi, French-Algerian footballer
 Klay Thompson, American basketball player
 February 9 
 Nicole Faria, Indian actress, model and the winner of the Miss Earth 2010 pageant
 Fyodor Smolov, Russian footballer
 February 10 – Sooyoung, Korean singer
 February 11
 Megan Anderson, Australian mixed martial artist
 Javier Aquino, Mexican footballer
 Q'orianka Kilcher, German-born American actress and activist
 February 12 
 Michelle Bartsch-Hackley, American volleyball player
 Robert Griffin III, American football player
 February 13
 Gyaincain Norbu, 11th Panchen Lama of Tibetan Buddhism according to some sources
 Kevin Strootman, Dutch footballer
 elrubiusOMG, Spanish YouTuber
 February 14 
 Chris Babb, American basketball player
 Brett Dier, Canadian actor
 February 15 – Masashi Ebinuma, Japanese judoka
 February 16 
 Liu Xiaotong, Chinese volleyball player
 The Weeknd, Canadian musician
 February 17 – Bea Rose Santiago, Filipino model
 February 18
 Choi Soo-young, South Korean singer, actress, and songwriter
 Bryan Oviedo, Costa Rican footballer
 Park Shin-hye, South Korean actress
 February 19
 Ryad Boudebouz, French-Algerian footballer
 Saad Al Sheebi, Qatari footballer
 February 20 – Ciro Immobile, Italian footballer
 February 21 – Mattias Tedenby, Swedish ice hockey player
 February 25
 Younès Belhanda, French-Moroccan footballer
 Ehsan Hajsafi, Iranian footballer
 Huang Xuechen, Chinese synchronised swimmer
 February 27
 Anna Fedorova, Ukrainian pianist and soloist
 Lindsey Morgan, American actress
 Megan Young, Filipino-American actress, model, television host, and beauty contest title holder
 February 28
 Georgina Leonidas, British actress
 Anna Muzychuk, Ukrainian chess player

March

 March 1 
 Qandeel Baloch, Pakistani actress and model (d. 2016)
 Zhang Nan, Chinese badminton player
 March 2
 Lee Hong-gi, Korean singer
 Tiger Shroff, Indian actor
 March 4 
 Andrea Bowen, American actress
 Draymond Green, American basketball player
 March 5 – Marco Ureña, Costa Rican footballer
 March 6
 Derek Drouin, Canadian athlete
 Esti Ginzburg, Israeli model
 Patricia Yurena Rodríguez, Spanish model, actress, and beauty pageant titleholder
 March 7 
 Choi Jong-hoon, Korean singer
 Daniel Samonas, Canadian actor
 March 8
 Rémy Cabella, French footballer
 Kristinia DeBarge, American singer-songwriter
 Asier Illarramendi, Spanish footballer
 Petra Kvitová, Czech tennis player
 March 9
 Daley Blind, Dutch footballer
 YG, American rapper and actor
 March 10 – Inna Deriglazova, Russian foil fencer
 March 11 – Reiley McClendon, American actor
 March 12 – Vanessa Pose, Venezuelan actress
 March 13
 Emory Cohen, American actor 
 Sasha Clements, Canadian actress
 March 14 
 Joe Allen, Welsh footballer
 Thali García, Mexican actress
 Kolbeinn Sigþórsson, Icelandic footballer
 March 15 – Lauren Barfield, American volleyball player 
 March 17 
 Hozier, Irish singer-songwriter
 Saina Nehwal, Indian badminton player
 Aderbar Santos, Brazilian footballer
 March 18 – Michael J. Knowles, American conservative political commentator 
 March 20 
 Jung Kyung-eun, South Korean badminton player
 Stacy Martin, French actress
 Marcos Rojo, Argentine footballer 
 March 21 
 Andrew Albicy, French basketball player
 Mandy Capristo, German singer-songwriter, dancer, and model
 Nicolás Uriarte, Argentinian volleyball player
 March 22 – Sophie Caldwell, American cross-country skier
 March 23
 Jaime Alguersuari, Spanish Formula One driver
 Princess Eugenie of York, British princess
 March 24
 Aljur Abrenica, Filipino actor, dancer, model and singer
 Keisha Castle-Hughes, Australian-born New Zealand actress
 Starlin Castro, Dominican baseball player
 March 25 – Kiowa Gordon, American actor
 March 26
 Carly Chaikin, American actress
 Choi Woo-shik, South Korean actor
 Patrick Ekeng, Cameroonian footballer (d. 2016)
 Sarah Menezes, Brazilian judoka
 Romain Saïss, French-Moroccan footballer
 Xiumin, South Korean singer and actor
 March 27
 Kimbra, New Zealand singer and actress
 Nicolas Nkoulou, Cameroonian footballer
 Ben Hunt, Australian rugby league player
 March 28
 Zoella, English YouTuber and vlogger
 Ekaterina Bobrova, Russian ice dancer
 Laura Harrier, American actress and model
 March 29 – Timothy Chandler, German-American soccer player
 March 30
 Lee Gi-kwang, Korean singer
 Thomas Rhett, American singer and songwriter
 Matt Simpson, American goalball player
 Corey Cott, American actor and singer
 Cassie Scerbo, American actress, singer and dancer
 March 31
 Bang Yong-guk, South Korean rapper
 Lyra McKee, Northern Irish journalist (d. 2019)
 Tommy Smith, English-New Zealand footballer

April

 April 1 – Justin Hamilton, Croatian-American Basketball player
 April 2
 Yevgeniya Kanayeva, Russian gymnast
 Miralem Pjanić, Bosnian footballer
 April 3
 Karim Ansarifard, Iranian footballer
 Madison Brengle, American tennis player
 Lovre Kalinić, Croatian footballer
 April 5
 Kim Jung-hyun, South Korean actor
 Haruma Miura, Japanese actor and singer (d. 2020) 
 Iryna Pamialova, Belarusian sprint canoeist
 April 6 – Charlie McDermott, American actor
 April 7
 Nickel Ashmeade, Jamaican sprinter
 Sorana Cîrstea, Romanian tennis player
 April 8
 Freddie, Hungarian singer
 Kim Jong-hyun, South Korean singer (d. 2017) 
 April 9 – Kristen Stewart, American actress and director
 April 10
 Christoph Harting, German discus thrower
 Magnus Kirt, Estonian javelin thrower
 Maren Morris, American country singer
 Alex Pettyfer, English actor
 April 11 – Thulani Serero, South African soccer player
 April 12 – Hiroki Sakai, Japanese footballer
 April 13 – Anastasija Sevastova, Latvian tennis player
 April 15 
 Julien Lyneel, French volleyball player
 Emma Watson, English actress, model, and activist
 April 16
 Lily Loveless, British actress
 Tony McQuay, American sprinter
 Lorraine Nicholson, American actress and director
 Arthur Zanetti, Brazilian artistic gymnast
 April 18 
 Anna van der Breggen, Dutch cyclist
 Britt Robertson, American actress
 Wojciech Szczęsny, Polish football player
 April 19
 Kim Chiu, Filipino actress
 Héctor Herrera, Mexican footballer
 Ayaka Takahashi, Japanese badminton player
 April 20 – Lu Han, South Korean singer
 April 22 
 Machine Gun Kelly, American rapper and singer 
 Eve Muirhead, British curler
 April 23 
 Mathias Jørgensen, Danish footballer
 Dev Patel, British actor
 April 24 – Kim Tae-ri, South Korean actress
 April 25 – Jean-Éric Vergne, French Formula 1 driver
 April 26 – Jonathan dos Santos, Mexican footballer
 April 27 
 Austin Dillon, American racing driver
 Lou de Laâge, French television actress
 April 28 – Chelsea Stewart, American soccer player
 April 29 – Chris Johnson, American basketball player

May

 May 1 – Caitlin Stasey, Australian actress
 May 2
 Paul George, American basketball player 
 Kay Panabaker, American actress
 May 3
 Brooks Koepka, American professional golfer
 May 4 – Andrea Torres, Filipino actress
 May 5
 Matteo Ciacci, Sammarinese politician; former Captain Regent of San Marino
 Hannah Davis, American model
 May 7 – Sideris Tasiadis, German slalom canoeist
 May 8
 Anastasia Fesikova, Russian swimmer
 Kemba Walker, American basketball player
 May 10
 Maxine Medina, Filipino actress and model
 Lauren Potter, American actress
 Ivana Vuleta, Serbian long jumper
 May 12
 Florent Amodio, French figure skater
 Etika, YouTube personality (d. 2019)
 May 14 – Sasha Spielberg, American musician
 May 15 
 Jordan Eberle, Canadian Ice Hockey player
 Lee Jong-hyun, Korean singer
 May 16
 Deniz Akdeniz, Australian actor
 Thomas Brodie-Sangster, British actor
 Marc John Jefferies, American actor
 May 17
 Will Clyburn, American basketball player
 Ross Butler, American actor
 Leven Rambin, American actress
 May 18
 Heo Ga-yoon, South Korean singer and actress
 Luke Kleintank, American actor
 Yuya Osako, Japanese footballer
 May 20 – Josh O'Connor, English actor
 May 21 – Choi In-jeong, South Korean fencer
 May 24
 Joey Logano, American race car driver
 Yuya Matsushita, Japanese singer, dancer, and actor
 May 26 – Umar Akmal, Pakistani cricketer
 May 27 – Chris Colfer, American actor
 May 28
 Rohan Dennis, Australian racing cyclist
 Jonas Hector, German footballer
 Kyle Walker, English footballer
 May 29 – Ramil Guliyev, Azerbaijani born-Turkish sprinter
 May 30
 Dean Collins, American actor
 Josef Šural, Czech footballer (d. 2019)
 Yoona, Korean singer and actress
 May 31
 Erik Karlsson, Swedish Ice Hockey player
 Gabriel Nadeau-Dubois, Canadian politician
 Phillipa Soo, American actress and singer

June

 June 2 – Jack Lowden, Scottish actor
 June 4 – Evan Spiegel, co-founder and CEO of Snap Inc.
 June 5 
 Ona Carbonell, Spanish synchronized swimmer
 Junior Hoilett, Canadian soccer player
 June 6 
 Raisa Andriana, Indonesian singer
 Ryan Higa, American comedian, YouTuber and actor
 June 7
 Iggy Azalea, Australian recording artist
 Allison Schmitt, American swimmer
 June 9
 Matthias Mayer, Austrian Olympic alpine skier
 Lauren Socha, English actress
 June 11 – Christophe Lemaitre, French sprinter
 June 12 – Jrue Holiday, American basketball player
 June 13 – Aaron Taylor-Johnson, English actor
 June 16 
 John Newman, English singer
 Sanna Solberg-Isaksen, Norwegian handball player
 Silje Solberg-Østhassel, Norwegian handball player
 June 17
 Alan Dzagoev, Russian footballer
 Jordan Henderson, English international footballer
 June 18
 Jeremy Irvine, English actor 
 Sandra Izbașa, Romanian gymnast and Olympic gold medalist
 Christian Taylor, American triple jumper
 June 20 – Ding Ning, Chinese table tennis player
 June 21
 Knowledge Musona, Zimbabwean footballer
 Miriam Neureuther, German biathlete and Cross-country skier
 Håvard Nordtveit, Norwegian football player
 Sandra Perković, Croatian discus thrower
 June 22 – Kei Inoo, Japanese singer and actor
 June 23
 Lim Ji-yeon, South Korean actress
 Vasek Pospisil, Canadian tennis player
 June 25 – Andi Eigenmann, Filipina actress and model
 June 26 – Filip Novák, Czech football player
 June 27 – Angelia Ong, Filipino–Chinese model
 June 28 – Jasmine Richards, Canadian actress
 June 29 – Subaru Kimura, German-Japanese voice actor
 June 30
 Jaka Blažič, Slovenian basketball player
 N, South Korean singer and actor

July

 July 2
 Kayla Harrison, American judoka
 Roman Lob, German recording artist
 Margot Robbie, Australian actress
 Danny Rose, English footballer
 July 4 
 Melissa Barrera, Mexican actress and singer 
 David Kross, German actor
 Mikaela Mayer, American boxer
 July 6
 Jeremy Suarez, American actor
 Jurijus Veklenko, Lithuanian singer-songwriter
 July 8 – Kevin Trapp, German footballer
 July 9
 Fábio, Brazilian footballer
 Sosuke Ikematsu, Japanese actor
 Rafael, Brazilian footballer
 Sung Joon, South Korean actor and model
 July 10
 Mike LiPetri, American politician
 Portia Clark, Zambian pop singer, songwriter, and philanthropist
 Elliot Knight, British actor
 Sung Joon, South Korean actor and model
 July 11
 Dan Colman, American professional poker player
 Connor Paolo, American actor
 Patrick Peterson, American football player
 Caroline Wozniacki, Danish tennis player
 July 12 – Rachel Brosnahan, American actress
 July 13 – Jonathan Mensah, Ghanaian footballer
 July 14 
 Federica Brignone, Italian alpine skier
 Ian Nepomniachtchi, Russian chess grandmaster
 July 15
 Alexander Calvert, Canadian actor
 Tyler Honeycutt, American basketball player (d. 2018)
 Damian Lillard, American basketball player
 July 16
 Daryl Homer, American fencer
 James Maslow, American actor and singer
 Lidewij Welten, Dutch field hockey player
 Wizkid, Nigerian singer-songwriter
 Johann Zarco, French Grand Prix motorcycle racer
 July 17 – Vanessa Low, German-born Australian Paralympic athlete
 July 18 – Saúl Álvarez, Mexican boxer
 July 19 
 Steven Anthony Lawrence, American actor
 Darlington Nagbe, Liberian-American soccer player
 July 21
 Fabrice N'Sakala, Congolese-democratic footballer
 Erislandy Savón, Cuban boxer
 July 23 – Kevin Reynolds, Canadian figure skater
 July 24 – Daveigh Chase, American actress
 July 25 – Mubarak Wakaso, Ghanaian footballer
 July 27
 Victoria Aveyard, American writer
 Indiana Evans, Australian actress
 Kriti Sanon, Indian actress
 David Storl, German track and field athlete
 July 28 – Soulja Boy, American rapper
 July 29
 Elli AvrRam, Swedish born-Greek actress
 Munro Chambers, Canadian actor
 Matt Prokop, American actor
 Anna Selezneva, Russian model
 Oleg Shatov, Russian footballer
 Shin Se-kyung, Korean actor

August

 
 August 1
 Neah Evans, Scottish racing cyclist
 Elton Jantjies, South African rugby player
 Jack O'Connell, English actor
 August 2 – Skylar Diggins-Smith, American basketball player
 August 5 – Álex Rodríguez, Panamanian footballer
 August 6 – Hólmar Örn Eyjólfsson, Icelandic footballer
 August 7 
 Helen Flanagan, English actress
 Tate Forcier, American football quarterback
 August 8
 Vladimír Darida, Czech footballer
 Abel Hernández, Uruguayan footballer
 Oti Mabuse, South African dancer
 Aleksandra Szwed, Polish actress
 Kane Williamson, New Zealand cricketer
 August 9
 Adelaide Kane, Australian actress
 Bill Skarsgård, Swedish actor
 Emily Tennant, Canadian actress 
 August 10
 Will Brittain, American actor
 Lucas Till, American actor
 Tai Woffinden, British speedway rider
 August 12
 Enzo Pineda, Filipino actor
 Mario Balotelli, Italian footballer
 Wissam Ben Yedder, French footballer
 August 13
 Shila Amzah, Malaysian singer-songwriter
 DeMarcus Cousins, American basketball player
 August 14 – Viktoria Orsi Toth, Italian beach volleyball player
 August 15
 Jennifer Lawrence, American actress
 Nyusha, Russian singer
 August 16 
 Christina Hammer, Kazakhstani-born German boxer
 Marta Menegatti, Italian beach volleyball player
 August 17 – Rachel Hurd-Wood, British actress
 August 20
 Omar El Kaddouri, Belgian-Moroccan footballer
 Öykü Karayel, Turkish actress
 Ranomi Kromowidjojo, Dutch swimmer
 August 21 
 Theyazin bin Haitham, Crown Prince of Oman
 Bo Burnham, American comedian
 August 22 – Adam Thielen, American football player
 August 23 – Mike Yastrzemski, American baseball player
 August 24
 Elizabeth Debicki, Australian actress
 Aloysius Pang, Singaporean actor (d. 2019) 
 August 25
 Aras Bulut İynemli, Turkish actor
 Salif Sané, French-Senegalese footballer
 August 26 – Lorenzo Brown, American basketball player
 August 27
 Tori Bowie, American athlete
 Luuk de Jong, Dutch footballer
 Adam Metzger, American musician, member of AJR
 Taylor Mitchell, Canadian singer (d. 2009)
 August 28
 Katie Findlay, Canadian actress
 Bojan Krkić, Spanish footballer
 August 29
 Patrick van Aanholt, Dutch footballer
 Nicole Gale Anderson, American actress

September

 September 2 
 Merritt Patterson, Canadian actress
 Marcus Ericsson, Swedish racing driver
 September 4
 Olha Kharlan, Ukrainian fencer
 Danny Worsnop, British musician
 September 5 – Yuna Kim, South Korean figure skater
 September 7 – Valentin Porte, French handball player
 September 6 – John Wall, American basketball player
 September 8
 Matt Barkley, American football player
 Matthew Dellavedova, Australian basketball player
 Dianne Doan, Canadian actress
 September 13
 Jamie Anderson, American snowboarder
 Luciano Narsingh, Dutch footballer
 September 14 – Douglas Costa, Brazilian footballer
 September 15
 Aaron Mooy, Australian footballer
 Matt Shively, American actor
 September 18 
 Lewis Holtby, German footballer
 Michael Smith, English professional darts player
 September 19
 Mário Fernandes, Brazilian-Russian footballer
 Saki Fukuda, Japanese actress
 Hollie Pearne-Webb, English field hockey player
 Kieran Trippier, English footballer
 September 20
 Erich Gonzales, Filipina actor and dancer
 Phillip Phillips, American singer
 John Tavares, Canadian ice hockey player
 September 21
 Ivan Dorschner, Filipino actor and host
 Allison Scagliotti, American actress, musician, and director
 Christian Serratos, American actress
 September 23
 Marigona Dragusha, Kosovan model
 Agustín Sierra, Argentine actor
 Çağatay Ulusoy, Turkish actor and model
 September 25
 Mao Asada, Japanese figure skater
 Edie Campbell, English model
 September 26 – Michael Matthews, Australian professional cyclist
 September 27 
 Dion Lewis, American football player
 Mitski, Japanese-American singer-songwriter
 September 28 – Kirsten Prout, Canadian actress
 September 29 
 Doug Brochu, American actor, comedian and voice actor
 Natasha Gregson Wagner, American actress
 September 30
 Shane Strickland, American professional wrestler 
 Dominique Aegerter, Swiss Grand prix motorcycle racer

October

 October 1
 Hazal Kaya, Tukish actress
 Anthony Lopes, French-Portuguese footballer
 October 2 – Samantha Barks, Manx singer and actress
 October 3
 Michele Morrone, Italian actor, model and singer
 Johan Le Bon, French cyclist
 Rhian Ramos, Filipino actress
 October 4 
 Saki, Japanese guitarist and songwriter
 Sergey Shubenkov, Russian hurdler
 October 6 
 Jordan Hamilton, American basketball player
 Hotaru Yamaguchi, Japanese footballer
 October 7
 Sebastián Coates, Uruguayan footballer
 Ayla Kell, American actress
 Thunder, South Korean pop singer
 October 10 – Jakub Vadlejch, Czech javelin thrower
 October 11 – Sebastian Rode, German footballer
 October 12
 Brock Coyle, American football player
 Melody, Spanish singer
 October 13 
 Pooja Hegde, Indian actress
 Bailey Noble, American actress
 Milica Todorović, Serbian actress and singer
 October 15 – Jeon Ji-yoon, South Korean rapper, songwriter, and actress
 October 16 
 Sam Bennett, Irish cyclist
 Jóhanna Guðrún Jónsdóttir, Icelandic singer
 October 18
 Óscar Opazo, Chilean footballer
 Carly Schroeder, American actress
 October 19
 Samuel Nascimento, Brazilian actor, singer, and dancer
 Ciara Renée, American actress
 October 20 – Galadriel Stineman, American actress
 October 21 – Ricky Rubio, Spanish basketball player
 October 22 – Jonathan Lipnicki, American actor and producer
 October 23
 Paradise Oskar, Finnish singer-songwriter
 Stan Walker, New Zeland singer and actor
 October 24
 Kirby Bliss Blanton, American actress
 İlkay Gündoğan, German footballer
 October 27 – Jóhann Berg Guðmundsson, Icelandic footballer
 October 28 – Youssef Msakni, Tunisian footballer
 October 29
 Ender Inciarte, Venezuelan baseball player
 Amarna Miller, Spanish porn actress
 Eric Saade, Swedish pop singer
 Carlson Young, American actress
 October 30 – Jorge López, Chilean actor
 October 31 
 JID, American rapper
 Emiliano Sala, Argentine footballer (d. 2019)

November

 November 2 
 Kévin Tillie, French volleyball player
 Kendall Schmidt, American actor, singer, and guitarist
 November 3 – Ellyse Perry, Australian cricketer
 November 4 – Jean-Luc Bilodeau, Canadian actor
 November 6
 Kris, Chinese Rapper and former member of EXO
 André Schürrle, German footballer
 November 7 – David de Gea, Spanish footballer
 November 8 
 SZA, American R&B singer
 Kira Walkenhorst, German beach volleyball player
 November 9 – Romain Bardet, French professional racing cyclist
 November 10
 Mireia Belmonte, Spanish swimmer
 Vanessa Ferrari, Italian gymnast
 Aron Jóhannsson, American soccer player
 Leo, South Korean singer-songwriter
 November 11
 Tom Dumoulin, Dutch road bicycle racer 
 Rupinder Pal Singh, Indian field hockey player
 Georginio Wijnaldum, Dutch footballer
 November 12 – Florent Manaudou, French swimmer
 November 13 
 Kathleen Herles, American voice actress
 Artem Laguta, Russian motorcycle speedway rider
 November 14
 Roman Bürki, Swiss footballer
 Jessica Jacobs, Australian actress and singer (d. 2008)
 November 15 – Kanata Hongō, Japanese actor
 November 17 – Shanica Knowles, American actress and singer
 November 18 – Kira Walkenhorst, German beach volleyball player
 November 20 – Zack Martin, American football player
 November 22
 Kartik Aaryan, Indian actor
 Jang Dong-woo, South Korean singer and dancer
 Seo Eunkwang, South Korean singer
 November 23
 Eddy Kim, Korean singer
 Nick Williams, American football player
 November 24 – Sarah Hyland, American actress
 November 26
 Rita Ora, English singer
 Danny Welbeck, English footballer
 November 27
 Blackbear, American hip hop musician, singer, composer, and record producer
 Josh James, British singer
 November 28 – Dedryck Boyata, Belgian footballer
 November 29 
 Diego Boneta, Mexican actor and singer-songwriter
 Lee Min-hyuk, South Korean singer
 Sheldon Richardson, American football player
 November 30 – Magnus Carlsen, Norwegian chess grand master

December

 December 1 – Chanel Iman, American model
 December 3 – Christian Benteke, Congolese born-Belgian footballer
 December 6 – Elizabeth Bruenig, American journalist
 December 7 – David Goffin, Belgian tennis player
 December 10 – Shoya Tomizawa, Japanese motorcycle rider (d. 2010)
 December 11 – He Zi, Chinese diver 
 December 12 – Seungri, South Korean singer
 December 13 – Corey Anderson, New Zealand cricketer
 December 14 – Ali Zein, Egyptian handball player
 December 16 – Aziz Behich, Australian footballer
 December 17 
 Karen Ibasco, Filipino physicist and beauty pageant titleholder who was crowned Miss Earth 2017.
 Graham Rogers, American actor
 December 18 – Victor Hedman, Swedish Ice Hockey player
 December 19 – Tatiana Suarez, American mixed martial artist
 December 20 – JoJo, American singer and actress
 December 22 – Jean-Baptiste Maunier, French actor
 December 23 – Anna Maria Perez de Tagle, American actress and singer
 December 26
 Jon Bellion, American singer
 Andy Biersack, American singer-songwriter
 Denis Cheryshev, Russian footballer
 Aaron Ramsey, Welsh footballer
 December 27 – Milos Raonic, Canadian tennis player
 December 28
 Marcos Alonso, Spanish footballer
 David Archuleta, American singer and pianist
 December 29 – Sofiane Hanni, French-Algerian footballer
 December 30
 Fénix, Mexican wrestler
 Joe Root, English cricketer
 Bruno Henrique, Brazilian footballer
 December 31
 Patrick Chan, Canadian figure skater
 Zhao Jing, Chinese swimmer

Deaths

January

 January 2 – Alan Hale Jr, American actor (b. 1921)
 January 4
 Alberto Lleras Camargo, Colombian politician, 20th President of Colombia (b. 1906)
 Harold Eugene Edgerton, American electrical engineer (b. 1903)
 January 5 – Arthur Kennedy, American actor (b. 1914)
 January 6
 Ian Charleson, British actor (b. 1949)
 Pavel Cherenkov, Russian physicist, Nobel Prize laureate (b. 1904)
 January 7 – Bronko Nagurski, Canadian-American football player (b. 1908)
 January 8
 Jaime Gil de Biedma, Spanish poet (b. 1929)
 Terry-Thomas, English actor and comedian (b. 1911)
 January 9
 Northern Calloway, American actor (b. 1948)
 Bazilio Olara-Okello, Ugandan military officer and statesman (b. 1929)
 January 10 – Lyle R. Wheeler, American art director (b. 1905)
 January 14 – Mani Madhava Chakyar, Indian performing artist (b. 1899)
 January 15
 Gordon Jackson, British actor (b. 1923)
 William O'Neal, American FBI informant (b. 1949)
 January 17 – Charles Hernu, French politician (b. 1923)
 January 18 – Melanie Appleby, British musician (b. 1966)
 January 19
 Arthur Goldberg, American Justice of the Supreme Court (b. 1908)
 Bhagwan Shree Rajneesh, Indian mystic (b. 1931)
 Herbert Wehner, German Social Democratic politician (b. 1906)
 January 20
 Prince Naruhiko Higashikuni, 30th Prime Minister of Japan (b. 1887)
 Barbara Stanwyck, American actress (b. 1907)
 January 22
 Mariano Rumor, Italian politician, 39th Prime Minister of Italy (b. 1915)
 Roman Vishniac, Russian-American photographer (b. 1897)
 January 23 – Allen Collins, American musician (b. 1952)
 January 24
 Madge Bellamy, American actress (b. 1899)
 Araken Patusca, Brazilian footballer (b. 1905)
 January 25
 Dámaso Alonso, Spanish poet (b. 1898)
 Ava Gardner, American actress (b. 1922)
 January 26 – Lewis Mumford, American historian of science (b. 1895)

February

 February 2
 Paul Ariste, Estonian linguist (b. 1905)
 Mel Lewis, American jazz musician (b. 1929)
 February 7 – Jimmy Van Heusen, American composer (b. 1913)
 February 8 – Del Shannon, American musician and singer (b. 1934)
 February 14
 José Luis Panizo, Spanish footballer (b. 1922)
 Jean Wallace, American actress (b. 1923)
 February 15
 Henry Brandon, German-American actor (b. 1912)
 Ulf Johansson, Swedish actor (b. 1922)
 February 16 – Keith Haring, American pop artist (b. 1958)
 February 17 – Erik Rhodes, American actor (b. 1906)
 February 19
 Otto E. Neugebauer, Austrian-born American mathematician and historian of science (b. 1899)
 Michael Powell, British director (b. 1905)
 February 23 
 José Napoleón Duarte, Salvadoran politician, 39th President of El Salvador (b. 1925)
 James M. Gavin, American general (b. 1907)
 February 24
 Malcolm Forbes, American publisher (b. 1919)
 Sandro Pertini, Italian Socialist politician, 7th President of Italy (b. 1896)
 Johnnie Ray, American singer (b. 1927)
 February 27 – Les Ames, British cricketer (b. 1905)
 February 28 – Greville Wynne, British spy and courier (b. 1919)

March

 March 5 – Gary Merrill, American actor (b. 1915)
 March 6 – H. George Decancq, American engineer
 March 12 – Philippe Soupault, French poet (b. 1897)
 March 13
 Bruno Bettelheim, American child psychologist (b. 1903)
 Karl Münchinger, German conductor (b. 1915)
 Michael Stewart, Baron Stewart of Fulham, British politician (b. 1906)
 March 15 – Tom Harmon, American football player and broadcaster (b. 1919)
 March 17
 Capucine, French actress and fashion model (b. 1928)
 Ric Grech, British musician (b. 1946)
 March 19 – Andrew Wood, American musician (b. 1966)
 March 20 – Lev Yashin, Russian footballer (b. 1929)
 March 22 – Gerald Bull, Canadian scientist (b. 1928)

April

 April 2 – Aldo Fabrizi, Italian actor (b. 1905)
 April 3 – Sarah Vaughan, American jazz vocalist (b. 1924)
 April 6
 James MacNabb, British Olympic rower (b. 1901)
 Alfred Sohn-Rethel, German economist and philosopher (b. 1899)
 April 7 – Ronald Evans, American astronaut (b. 1933)
 April 8 – Ryan White, American AIDS activist (b. 1971)
 April 10 – Fortune Gordien, American Olympic athlete (b. 1922)
 April 13 – Luis Trenker, South Tyrolean film producer, director, writer, actor, and architect (b. 1892)
 April 14
 Ahmed Balafrej, Moroccan politician, Foreign Minister and 2nd Prime Minister of Morocco (b. 1908)
 Sabicas, Spanish guitarist (b. 1912)
 April 15 – Greta Garbo, Swedish-American actress (b. 1905)
 April 17 – Ralph Abernathy, American civil rights activist (b. 1926)
 April 18
 Gory Guerrero, American wrestler (b. 1921)
 Frédéric Rossif, French film and television director (b. 1922)
 Robert D. Webb, American film director (b. 1903)
 April 19 – Marco Aurelio Robles, Panamanian politician, 20th President of Panama (b. 1905)
 April 20 – Horst Sindermann, East German politician, 3rd Prime Minister of the German Democratic Republic (East Germany) (b. 1915)
 April 21 – Erté, French Art Deco artist (b. 1892)
 April 22 – Albert Salmi, American actor (b. 1928)
 April 23 – Paulette Goddard, American actress (b. 1910)
 April 25 – Dexter Gordon, American jazz saxophonist (b. 1923)

May

 May 3 – Patriarch Pimen I of Moscow (b. 1910)
 May 5 – Walter Bruch, German electrical engineer (b. 1908)
 May 6 – Charles Farrell, American actor (b. 1900)
 May 7 – Prince Andrew of Yugoslavia (b. 1929)
 May 8
 Luigi Nono, Italian composer (b. 1924)
 Tomás Ó Fiaich, Irish Roman Catholic prelate (b. 1923)
 May 10
 Susan Oliver, American actress (b. 1932)
 Walker Percy, American writer (b. 1916)
 May 12 – Andrei Kirilenko, Soviet politician (b. 1906)
 May 16
 Sammy Davis Jr., American actor, dancer, and singer (b. 1925)
 Jim Henson, Muppets creator, American puppeteer, and filmmaker (b. 1936)
 May 18 – Jill Ireland, English actress (b. 1936)
 May 22 – Rocky Graziano, American boxer (b. 1919)
 May 25 – Vic Tayback, American actor (b. 1930)
 May 29 – Hussein bin Onn, Malay politician, 3rd Prime Minister of Malaysia (b. 1922)
 May 31 – Willy Spühler, Swiss politician (b. 1902)

June

 June 1 – Ivan Serov, head of the KGB (b. 1905)
 June 1 – Maharaj Charan Singh, Fourth Satguru of Radha Soami Satsang Beas (b. 1916)
 June 2 – Rex Harrison, English actor (b. 1908)
 June 3 – Robert Noyce, American businessman and inventor (b. 1927)
 June 4
 Stiv Bators, American singer (b. 1949)
 Jack Gilford, American actor (b. 1908)
 June 5 – Vasili Kuznetsov, Soviet politician, provisional head of the State (b. 1901)
 June 7 – Alfredo Poveda, Ecuadorean military officer and statesman, interim President of Ecuador (b. 1926)
 June 8 – José Figueres Ferrer, Costa Rican politician, 32nd President of Costa Rica (b. 1906)
 June 11 – Vaso Čubrilović, Yugoslav politician (b. 1897)
 June 12 – Terence O'Neill, 4th Prime Minister of Northern Ireland (b. 1914)
 June 13 – Ra'ana Liaquat Ali Khan, Pakistani stateswoman, First Lady of Pakistan (b. 1905)
 June 20 – Ina Balin, American actress (b. 1937)
 June 22 – Ilya Frank, Russian physicist, Nobel Prize laureate (b. 1908)
 June 24 – Germán Suárez Flamerich, 50th President of Venezuela (b. 1907)
 June 29 – Irving Wallace, American writer (b. 1916)

July

 July 1 – Jurriaan Schrofer, Dutch sculptor, designer, and educator (b. 1926)
 July 4 – Phil Boggs, American Olympic diver (b. 1949)
 July 7 – Cazuza, Brazilian poet, singer and composer (b. 1958)
 July 8 – Howard Duff, American actor (b. 1913)
 July 15 – Margaret Lockwood, English actress (b. 1916)
 July 18
 Yves Chaland, French cartoonist (b. 1957)
 Yun Posun, South Korean politician, 2nd President of the Republic of Korea (South Korea) (b. 1897)
 July 19 – Eddie Quillan, American actor (b. 1907)
 July 20 – Sergei Parajanov, Georgian-Armenian film director (b. 1924)
 July 22 – Manuel Puig, Argentinian writer (b. 1932)
 July 23 – Kenjiro Takayanagi, Japanese television engineer (b. 1899)
 July 26 – Brent Mydland, American keyboardist for The Grateful Dead (b. 1952)
 July 27 – Bobby Day, American rock and roll and R&B musician (b. 1930)
 July 29 – Bruno Kreisky, Austrian Social Democratic politician, 17th Chancellor of Austria (b. 1911)
 July 31 – Fernando Sancho, Spanish actor (b. 1916)

August

 August 1 – Norbert Elias, German Jewish sociologist (b. 1897)
 August 6 – Jacques Soustelle, French politician and anthropologist (b. 1912)
 August 9 – Joe Mercer, English footballer (b. 1914)
 August 12 – Dorothy Mackaill, British-born American actress (b. 1903)
 August 15 – Viktor Tsoi, Russian singer, actor, and poet (b. 1962)
 August 17 – Pearl Bailey, American singer and actress (b. 1918)
 August 18 – B. F. Skinner, American psychologist (b. 1904)
 August 22
 Luigi Dadaglio, Italian cardinal (b. 1914)
 Boris Shcherbina, Soviet politician, crisis management supervisor of the Chernobyl disaster (b. 1919)
 August 23 – David Rose, British-born American songwriter, composer, and arranger (b. 1910)
 August 24 – Sergei Dovlatov, Russian author (b. 1941)
 August 26 – Mário Pinto de Andrade, Angolan politician and poet (b. 1928)
 August 27
 Luigi Beccali, Italian Olympic athlete (b. 1907)
 Raymond St. Jacques, American actor (b. 1930)
 Stevie Ray Vaughan, American guitarist (b. 1954)

September

 September 1 – Geir Hallgrímsson, Icelandic politician, 16th Prime Minister of Iceland (b. 1925)
 September 2 – John Bowlby, British psychologist and psychiatrist (b. 1907)
 September 4 – Irene Dunne, American actress (b. 1898)
 September 6
 Tom Fogerty, American musician (b. 1941)
 Len Hutton, English cricketer (b. 1916)
 September 7
 Ahti Karjalainen, 28th Prime Minister of Finland (b. 1923)
 A. J. P. Taylor, English historian (b. 1906)
 September 9
 Nicola Abbagnano, Italian philosopher (b. 1901)
 Samuel Doe, Liberian military officer and statesman, 21st President of Liberia (b. 1951)
 September 19 – Hermes Pan, American choreographer (b. 1910)
 September 21 – Xu Xiangqian, Communist military leader in the People's Republic of China, former Defense minister (b. 1901)
 September 26 – Alberto Moravia, Italian novelist (b. 1907)
 September 30 – Patrick White, Australian writer, Nobel Prize laureate (b. 1912)

October

 October 1 – Curtis LeMay, United States Air Force general (b. 1906)
 October 3 – André Grabar, historian of Romanesque art and the art of the Eastern Roman Empire (b. 1896)
 October 4 – Jill Bennett, British actress (b. 1931)
 October 5 – Peter Taylor, English footballer and manager (b. 1928)
 October 7 – Rashid bin Said Al-Maktoum, vice-president and 2nd Prime Minister of United Arab Emirates and Emir (Ruler) of Dubai (b. 1912)
 October 8 – Juan José Arévalo, Guatemalan politician, 24th President of Guatemala (b. 1904)
 October 13 – Lê Đức Thọ, Vietnamese general and politician, recipient of the Nobel Peace Prize (b. 1911)
 October 14 – Leonard Bernstein, American composer and conductor (b. 1918)
 October 15 – Delphine Seyrig, French actress (b. 1932)
 October 16 – Art Blakey, American jazz musician (b. 1919)
 October 20 – Joel McCrea, American actor (b. 1905)
 October 21 – Dany Chamoun, Lebanese politician (b. 1934)
 October 22 – Louis Althusser, French philosopher (b. 1918)
 October 26
 Lawrence Andreasen, United States Olympic diver, killed in dive from Vincent Thomas Bridge (b. 1945)
 William S. Paley, American media executive (b. 1901)
 October 27
 Xavier Cugat, American band leader (b. 1900)
 Jacques Demy, French film director (b. 1931)
 Ugo Tognazzi, Italian actor (b. 1922)
 October 29 – William French Smith, 74th United States Attorney General (b. 1917)

November 

 November 3 – Mary Martin, American actress and singer (b. 1913)
 November 4 – David Stirling, British army officer, founder of the SAS (b. 1915)
 November 5 – Meir Kahane, American rabbi and political figure (b. 1932)
 November 7 – Lawrence Durrell, British writer (b. 1912)
 November 11
 Rusty Goodman, American Southern Gospel singer (b. 1933)
 Sadi Irmak, Turkish politician, 17th Prime Minister of Turkey (b. 1904)
 Yiannis Ritsos, Greek poet (b. 1909)
 November 12 – Eve Arden, American actress (b. 1908)
 November 13 – Don Chaffey, British film director (b. 1917)
 November 14 – Paula Nenette Pepin, French musician (b. 1908)
 November 17 – Robert Hofstadter, American physicist, Nobel Prize laureate (b. 1915)
 November 19 – Georgy Flyorov, Soviet nuclear physicist (b. 1913)
 November 23
 Roald Dahl, British novelist, short-story writer, poet, screenwriter, and wartime fighter pilot (b. 1916)
 Nguyễn Văn Tâm, South Vietnamese politician, 4th Prime Minister of the State of Vietnam (South Vietnam) (b. 1893)
 November 24 – Dodie Smith, English novelist and playwright (b. 1896)
 November 26 – Feng Youlan, Chinese philosopher (b. 1895)
 November 27 – David White, American actor (b. 1916)

December

 December 1
 Sergio Corbucci, Italian film director (b. 1927)
 Vijaya Lakshmi Pandit, Indian diplomat and politician (b. 1900)
 December 2
 Aaron Copland, American composer (b. 1900)
 Robert Cummings, American actor (b. 1910)
 December 4 – Naoto Tajima, Japanese Olympic athlete (b. 1912)
 December 6 – Tunku Abdul Rahman, 1st Prime Minister of Malaysia (b. 1903)
 December 7
 Reinaldo Arenas, Cuban writer (b. 1943)
 Joan Bennett, American actress (b. 1910)
 December 8 
 Tadeusz Kantor, Polish painter, assemblage designer and theatre director (b. 1915)
 Boris Kochno, Russian poet, dancer, and librettist (b. 1906)
 Martin Ritt, American film director (b. 1914)
 December 9 – Mike Mazurki, American actor and wrestler (b. 1909)
 December 10 – Armand Hammer, American business tycoon (b. 1898)
 December 11 – Concha Piquer, Spanish singer and actress (b. 1908)
 December 13 – Alice Marble, American tennis champion (b. 1913)
 December 14 – Friedrich Dürrenmatt, Swiss writer (b. 1921)
 December 18 – Anne Revere, American actress (b. 1903)
 December 23 – Wendell Scott, American race car driver (b. 1921)
 December 24 – Thorbjørn Egner, Norwegian author (b. 1912)
 December 31 – Vasily Lazarev, Soviet cosmonaut (b. 1928)

Nobel Prizes

 Physics – Jerome Isaac Friedman, Henry Way Kendall, and Richard Edward Taylor
 Chemistry – Elias James Corey
 Physiology or Medicine – Joseph Murray, E. Donnall Thomas
 Literature – Octavio Paz
 Peace – Mikhail Gorbachev
 Bank of Sweden Prize in Economic Sciences in Memory of Alfred Nobel – Harry Markowitz, Merton Miller, William F. Sharpe

Fields Medal
 Vladimir Drinfeld, Vaughan Jones, Shigefumi Mori, Edward Witten

References